Lake Roberts Heights is a census-designated place in Grant County, New Mexico, United States. Its population was 32 as of the 2010 census. New Mexico State Road 35 passes through the community.

Geography

Demographics

References

Census-designated places in New Mexico
Census-designated places in Grant County, New Mexico